Agyneta fusca is a species of sheet weaver found in Peru. It was described by Millidge in 1991.

References

fusca
Fauna of Peru
Spiders of South America
Spiders described in 1991